Sirwan Saber Barzani (born ) is an Iraqi Kurdish businessman and military commander. He is a member of the Kurdish Barzani family. He is the older brother of Saywan Barzani, an Kurdish diplomat, and Hasan Barzani who died in an air accident in October 2017.

Sirwan is the nephew of the former President of Iraqi Kurdistan, Masoud Barzani and cousin to the President of Kurdistan, Nechirvan Barzani. He is one of the most famous young generals in the Kurdistan Region's military force in Iraq, called the Kurdish Peshmerga.

Career

Korek Telecom 

Barzani is the managing director of Korek Telecom, a mobile phone operator in Iraq with seven million subscribers and close to 3,500 towers across Iraq. The estimated worth of the company is $2 billion. Critics suggest that, as Masoud Barzani's nephew, he has only achieved his wealth through nepotism. Kamal Chomani, a critic of the Kurdistan Regional Government, said that: "He could have supported the Peshmerga through his giant companies, but everyone knows Sirwan Barzani has become a billionaire by using KRG  institutions." In response, Barzani has said "This is normal. When people talk bad about you, it means that you are doing good, and I will do more."

In 2011, Barzani was forced to deny that Korek belonged to the KDP, the political party led by his uncle, and revealed that he was one of four shareholders, and that the other three shareholders were "not very well-known" and were "businessmen not affiliated to the KDP". He explained that this was because "we started with a very small business and very small amount of capital."

Peshmerga fighter 

Barzani was a Peshmerga fighter for 12 years, fighting against Saddam Hussein's forces in the mountains of the Kurdistan region.[3] During this time, he earned the nickname "Black Tiger". He was educated at the military academy in Zakho, and established the Barzani brigade in 1994. He retired from the army in 2000.

In June 2014, with ISIL threatening the Kurdistan region of Iraq, Barzani's uncle and president, Masoud Barzani, called for all veterans to return to the front lines. Barzani himself was given a senior role in leading the Peshmerga forces. ISIL attacked Kurdistan in August 2014, and Barzani and his men were preparing to leave to take back Sinjar from ISIL on 3 August. However, on 6 August, Erbil, the capital of the Kurdistan region, came under threat from ISIL fighters, so Barzani took 150 men to the city and pushed their forces back to Gwer by 10 August, aided by US-led air strikes.

In January 2015, ISIL carried out a surprise attack on the Peshmerga at Gwer, killing 26 and injuring 46. The loss was blamed on Barzani, who had been in talks with the Iraqi Army about joint operations, by aspects of the Kurdish opposition's media. In January 2016, it was noted that he was the commander of Kurdish forces in one of the "hottest sectors" of the front line with ISIL.

References 

Living people
Iraqi Kurdish people
Year of birth missing (living people)